Macrobathra distincta is a moth in the family Cosmopterigidae. It was described by Walsingham in 1891. It is found in Gambia.

References

Natural History Museum Lepidoptera generic names catalog

Macrobathra
Moths described in 1891